Justin Simien (born May 7, 1983) is an American filmmaker, actor, and author. His first feature film, Dear White People, won the U.S. Dramatic Special Jury Award for Breakthrough Talent at the 2014 Sundance Film Festival. The film was later adapted into the Netflix series of the same name (2017–2021). Simien has also been named to Variety's 2013 "10 Directors to Watch" list.

Early life
Simien was born on May 7, 1983, in Houston, Texas. He is the son of Anna Simien. Raised in the metro area, he attended the Kinder High School for the Performing and Visual Arts. After graduation he studied film at Chapman University in California. Simien worked a number of jobs in Los Angeles prior to directing his first feature film, including social media manager at Sony Television, publicity assistant at Focus Features, and publicity coordinator at Paramount Pictures.

Career
Simien directed three short films prior to Dear White People: Rings (2006), My Women: Inst Msgs (2009), and INST MSGS (Instant Messages) (2009).

Simien started work on what would become Dear White People in 2006, with inspiration for the script coming from his feelings while attending the predominantly white Chapman University. In 2012, he created a concept trailer using his tax refund as funding. With the concept trailer as a centerpiece, he launched a crowdfunding campaign on Indiegogo to raise $25,000 but he got an overwhelming response and managed to raise $40,000 instead.

The film premiered in-competition in the US Dramatic Category at 2014 Sundance Film Festival on January 18, 2014. The film began its theatrical release in the United States on October 17, 2014. In its opening weekend the film grossed $344,000 in only eleven locations for an impressive $31,273 per theatre average.

Dear White People won Simien the U.S. Dramatic Special Jury Award for Breakthrough Talent at the 2014 Sundance Film Festival and the "Audience Award" at the 2014 San Francisco International Film Festival. Simien has also been named to Variety's 2013 "10 Directors to Watch" list.

On May 5, 2016, Lionsgate announced a deal to produce a Dear White People television series based on the film and distributed through Netflix with the show's first ten episodes to be written by Simien. The series was released in April 2017 to critical acclaim. Peter Debruge, writing for Variety, praised the writing, directing, social commentary, and cast. The New York Times praised the series' examination of concerns such as appropriation, assimilation, and conflict. In June 2017 the series was renewed for a second season, which was released in May 2018. On June 21, 2018, the series was renewed for a third season, which was released in August 2019. On October 2, 2019, the series was renewed for its fourth and final season, which was released in September 2021.

He was the writer, director, and songwriter for the 2020 horror comedy Bad Hair. It had its world premiere at the 2020 Sundance Film Festival. Shortly after, Hulu acquired distribution rights to the film. It was released in a limited release on October 16, 2020, by Neon, followed by digital streaming on Hulu on October 23, 2020. The film received mixed reviews from critics.

In 2019, Simien launched his production company, Culture Machine 

At Disney Investor Day 2020, he was announced as the showrunner for a new Disney+ series about Lando Calrissian, called Lando.

In April 2021, Simien signed on to direct a new film adaptation of the Disney theme park attraction, The Haunted Mansion. Haunted Mansion releases on July 28, 2023. More recently, he signed an overall deal with Paramount Television Studios, of which he develop projects like an adaptation of Geoff Johns' comic Geiger.

Influences
While Simien has been compared to director Spike Lee, Simien says he does not welcome this comparison because he does not want to be "the next Spike Lee" but instead "the next Justin Simien" (although he does credit Lee's Do the Right Thing with "showing him that it's possible to make these types of black films"). Simien also counts Woody Allen and Ingmar Bergman among his influences.

Personal life
At the 2014 Sundance Film Festival premiere of Dear White People, Simien publicly announced he is gay.

Filmography

Feature films

Short films

Television

References

External links

1983 births
African-American film directors
African-American film producers
African-American screenwriters
African-American television producers
American male screenwriters
Chapman University alumni
Film directors from Texas
Film producers from Texas
American gay writers
Independent Spirit Award winners
LGBT African Americans
LGBT film directors
LGBT people from Texas
American LGBT screenwriters
Living people
Screenwriters from Texas
Television producers from Texas
Writers from Houston
21st-century African-American people
20th-century African-American people
African-American male writers